The Soltan Bakht Agha mausoleum() is a historical mausoleum in Isfahan, Iran. Soltan Bakht Agha was Shah Sheykh Abu Esshaq's niece. Shah Sheykh Abu Esshaq was a handsome, good-natured but ill-fated King in the 14th century, who was contemporaneous with Hafez.

After the murder of her uncle by Mozaffarids, Soltan Bakht Agha decided to marry Mubariz al-Din Muhammad to gain an influence in the court of Mozaffarids and to cause a rift among the princes. Her brother-in-law, Jalaleddin, helped her with it. After a while Mubariz al-Din Muhammad realized his wife's intrigues and ordered to kill her. After the killing of Soltan Bakht Agha by Mubariz al-Din Muhammad, Jalaleddin captured Isfahan and ordered to build a splendid mausoleum on her tomb.

Dardasht minarets

Dardasht minarets are two historical minarets in Isfahan, Iran. These minarets are on a portal leading to the Soltan Bakht Agha Mausoleum. These minarets date back to the era of the Muzaffarids. The top part of the minarets had been destroyed.

Gallery

See also 
 History of Persian domes
 List of the historical structures in the Isfahan province

References 

Buildings and structures completed in the 14th century
Mausoleums in Isfahan
Muzaffarids (Iran)